Andrei "Bullet" Kulebin (born 14 May 1984 in Neustrelitz, Germany) is a Belarusian Muay Thai welterweight kickboxer fighting out of Minsk, Belarus for Gym "Kick Fighter".  He is an 18 time Muay Thai and kickboxing world champion who has won international titles both at amateur and professional level from 51 kg to 67 kg and is considered one of the top pound for pound Muay Thai fighters outside of Thailand.  In 2007 he was the first Muay Thai fighter in Belarus to be awarded the "Honored Master of Sport" by the countries president.

Career/biography

Kulebin began his kickboxing education at the age of eight in Minsk where he studied Taekwondo, only to switch to Muay Thai four years later, aged twelve, when he joined his (still) current club Gym "Kick Fighter", run by trainer Evgeni Dobrotvorski.  At his new gym he had access to some of the best facilities in Belarus, training with future world champions such as Dmitry Shakuta, Andrei Kotsur, Aliaksei Pekarchyk and Vasily Shish.  As a teenager he competed in a number of amateur competitions in Belarus, winning the junior national title at 38 kg as well as making his pro debut in 1999.  In 2001 he came third at the I.A.M.T.F. Amateur Muay Thai World Championships in Bangkok, Thailand and went even better later that year winning gold in the 51 kg category at the W.A.K.O. World Championships in 2001.  Success in the amateur circuit transferred across to the professional game in 2002 where Kulebin defeated compatriot Alexei Talantov to win the World Kickboxing Network (W.K.N.) European title, followed swiftly by the organizations intercontinental title, also in 2002.  Between 2002 and 2005 Kulebin won more titles – winning gold medals at the I.A.M.T.F. (world & European), W.A.K.O. and W.M.F. world championships, as well as claiming two W.K.N. professional world titles at super bantamweight and featherweight respectively.  He also suffered his first ever professional defeat losing to Rudolf Durica in an unsuccessful attempt for Durica's W.P.M.F. title at the King's Birthday event in Bangkok, Thailand at the end of 2005.  Bt 2006, at the age of 21, Kulebin had won seven world titles.

In October 2006, Kulebin entered the annual W.M.C. I-1 World Muay Thai Grand Prix, an eight-man competition for some of the top Muay Thai fighters at 63.5 kg.  He emerged victorious at the tournament in Hong Kong, gaining revenge over the man who had inflicted his first pro defeat and reigning I-1 champion, Rudolph Durica, in the semi finals, before defeating Santichai Or Boonchauy in the final.  He re-entered the W.M.C. I-1 World Grand Prix again the next year as defending champion once more defeating the two men he had faced the previous year, beating Santichai in the semi finals and Durica in the final.  His victory in Hong Kong was tempered somewhat by his defeat against Neung Songnarong and the loss of the W.K.N. intercontinental title he had won back in 2002 (this was Kulebin's first defence of the title in five years due to a lack of suitable opposition).  He also had success on the amateur circuit winning three world championships in one year; W.M.F., W.A.K.O. and I.F.M.A.  He followed up this success the following year by once again winning the W.M.C. I-1 World Grand Prix, for the third successive year.

2009 was another successful year for Kulebin, winning the W.M.C. featherweight title from reigning world champion Mosab Amrani at the Champions of Champions II event in Jamaica and then defending his title by knocking out Michael Dicks towards the end of the year, with a head kick.  Sandwiched between these title fights was a tournament win at the inaugural W.K.N. Big-8 competition held in Kulebin's home town of Minsk.  The next year was not quite as successful as he suffered three defeats to Thai opposition losing to Jeeprasak Inudom at the quarter final stage of the I.F.M.A. world championships (the first time in years he had failed to make at least the podium at an amateur championship) and twice to Sudsakorn Sor Klinmee in W.K.N. events, both of which were for prestigious titles within the organization.  Despite a relatively unsuccessful year, Kulebin still had time to win two world titles, winning the W.M.C. I-1 tournament for the fourth time and the little-known World Dynamite Thaiboxing title against Imran Khan in Sheffield, as well as gold at the IFMA European Championships.  At the beginning of 2011 Kulebin won another medal at amateur level, winning gold at the I.F.M.A. European championships in Antalya, Turkey.

On 31 March 2012 he was defeated by Liam Harrison in Manchester, UK by TKO in round 3.

He defeated Crice Boussoukou via decision in the quarter-finals of the 2012 Thai Fight 67 kg Tournament at Thai Fight 2012: King of Muay Thai in Bangkok, Thailand on October 23, 2012.

He then beat Adaylton Pereira de Freitas by decision in the tournament semi-finals in Nakhon Ratchasima, Thailand on November 25, 2012.

He lost to Singmanee Kaewsamrit on points again in the final on December 16, 2012.

On May 6, 2013, Kulebin defeated Umar Semata and Petchaswin Seatransferry to win the MAX Muay Thai 1 tournament in Surin, Thailand.

He will fight Saenchai PKSaenchaimuaythaigym at Combat Renaissance in China on September 17, 2013.

He lost to eventual champion Sagetdao Petpayathai on points in the semi-finals of the MAX Muay Thai 5: The Final Chapter tournament in Khon Kaen, Thailand on December 10, 2013.

He defeated Yang Zhou via UD at Combat Banchamek in Surin, Thailand on April 14, 2014.

Kulebin was initially set to fight Lee Sung-Hyun at the K-1 World MAX 2013 World Championship Tournament Final in Pattaya, Thailand on July 26, 2014. The event was postponed due to the 2014 Thai coup d'état, however. On September 17, 2016 Kulebin is fighting Fabio Pinca in Paris, France. On December 10, 2016 Kulebin is fighting Buakaw Banchamek in Beirut, Lebanon.

Titles

Professional
2015 WLF-World 8 Man Tournament Championship Runner-Up -67 kg
2014 IPCC World champion -67 kg
2014 Kunlun Fight 1 Tournament 2nd place
2013 MAX Muay Thai 1 Tournament Champion
2012 Thai Fight 67 kg Tournament 2nd place
2011 W.K.N. World Grand Prix Big-8 champion -66.7 kg
2010 World Dynamite Thaiboxing champion -66 kg
2010 W.K.N. World Grand Prix Big-8 runner up -66.7 kg
2010 W.M.C. I-1 World Grand Prix champion -66 kg
2009 W.M.C. world champion -63 kg (1st title defense)
2009 W.M.C. I-1 World Grand Prix runner up -66 kg
2009 W.K.N. World Grand Prix Big-8 champion -66.7 kg
2009 W.M.C. world champion -63 kg
2008 W.M.C. I-1 World Grand Prix champion -65 kg
2007 W.M.C. I-1 World Grand Prix champion -63.5 kg
2006 W.M.C. I-1 World Grand Prix champion -63.5 kg
2005 W.K.N. Muay Thai featherweight world champion -60.3 kg
2004 W.K.N. Muay Thai super bantamweight world champion -58.5 kg
2002-07 W.K.N. intercontinental champion
2002 W.K.N. European champion

Amateur
2021 I.F.M.A. World Muaythai Championships in Bangkok, Thailand  -71 kg
2019 I.F.M.A European Muaythai Championships in Minsk, Belarus  -71 kg
2018 I.F.M.A. World Muaythai Championships in Cancun, Mexico  -71 kg
2016 I.F.M.A. World Muaythai Championships in Jönköping, Sweden  -71 kg
2016 I.F.M.A. European Muaythai Championships in Split, Croatia  -71 kg
2015 I.F.M.A. Royal World cup Tournament in Bangkok, Thailand  -71 kg
2014 I.F.M.A. World Muaythai Championships in Langkawi, Malaysia  -67 kg
2014 I.F.M.A. European Muaythai Championships in Krakow, Poland  -67 kg
2013 SportAccord World Combat Games Muaythai champion  (-67 kg)
2013 I.F.M.A. European Muaythai Championships in Lisbon, Portugal  -67 kg
2012 I.F.M.A. World Muaythai Championships in Saint Petersburg, Russia  -67 kg
2011 I.F.M.A European Muaythai Championships in Antalya, Turkey  -67 kg
2010 I.F.M.A European Muaythai Championships in Velletri, Italy  -67 kg
2009 I.F.M.A. World Muaythai Championships in Bangkok, Thailand  -67 kg
2008 I.F.M.A. World Muaythai Championships in Busan, South Korea  -67 kg
2007 I.F.M.A. World Muaythai Championships in Bangkok, Thailand  -67 kg
2007 W.A.K.O. World Championships in Belgrade, Serbia  - 63.5 kg (K-1 Rules)
2007 W.M.F. World Muaythai Championships in Bangkok, Thailand  -63.5 kg
2006 I.F.M.A. World Muaythai Championships in Bangkok, Thailand  -60 kg
2006 W.M.F. World Muaythai Championships in Bangkok, Thailand  -60 kg
2005 W.M.F. World Muaythai Championships in Bangkok, Thailand  -60 kg
2004 W.M.F. World Muaythai Championships in Bangkok, Thailand  -57 kg
2003 W.A.K.O. World Championships in Yalta, Ukraine  -57 kg (Thai Boxing)
2003 I.A.M.T.F. World Muaythai Championships in Bangkok, Thailand  -55.3 kg
2002 I.A.M.T.F. European Muaythai Championships in Cyprus  -51 kg
2001 W.A.K.O. World Championships in Belgrade, Serbia & Montenegro  -51 kg (Thai Boxing)
2001 I.A.M.T.F. World Muaythai Championships in Bangkok, Thailand  -48 kg
x8 Belarusian national Muay Thai champion

Professional Muay Thai record 

|-  style="background:#c5d2ea;"
| 2021-04-17 || Draw ||align=left| Farkhad Akhmedjanov || WTKF || Minsk, Belarus || Draw || 3 ||3:00
|-  style="background:#c5d2ea;"
| 2019-05-01 || Draw||align=left| Zhang Chunyu || MAS Fight || China || Draw || 1 ||9:00
|-  style="background:#fbb;"
| 2018-12-01|| Loss||align=left| Yang Zhuo ||Wu Lin Feng 2018: WLF -67kg World Cup 2018-2019 6th Round  || Zhengzhou, China || Decision (Split) || 3 || 3:00
|-
|-  style="background:#cfc;"
| 2018-10-06 || Win ||align=left| Sergey Kosykh || Wu Lin Feng 2018: WLF -67kg World Cup 2018-2019 4th Round || Shangqiu,  China || Decision || 3 || 3:00
|-
|-  style="background:#cfc;"
| 2018-08-04 || Win ||align=left| Hu Yafei || Wu Lin Feng 2018: WLF -67kg World Cup 2018-2019 2nd Round || Zhengzhou, China || Decision || 3 || 3:00
|-
|-  style="background:#cfc;"
| 2018-02-03 || Win ||align=left| Gu Hui ||kunlun Fight 69 || China || Decision (Unanimous) || 3 || 3:00
|-
|-  style="background:#cfc;"
| 2017-10-31 || Win ||align=left| Singmanee Kaewsamrit || World Muaythai Charity Fight || Hong Kong, China || Decision (Unanimous) || 3 || 3:00
|-
|-  style="background:#fbb;"
| 2017-09-30 || Loss ||align=left| Sibmean Sitchefboontham || All Star Fight 2 || Bangkok, Thailand || Decision  || 3 || 3:00 
|-
|-  style="background:#fbb;"
| 2017-08-27 || Loss ||align=left| Sergey Kulyaba || Kunlun Fight 65 World MAX Tournament Final 16 || Qingdao, China || Ext.R Decision (2-3) || 4 || 3:00 
|-
|-  style="background:#cfc;"
| 2017-02-26 || Win ||align=left| Kong Lingfeng || Kunlun Fight 57 - World MAX 2017 Group 2 Tournament Final || Sanya, China || Decision (Unanimous) || 3 || 3:00
|-
! style=background:white colspan=9 |
|-
|-  style="background:#cfc;"
| 2017-02-26 || Win ||align=left| Ali Makhi || Kunlun Fight 57 - World MAX 2017 Group 2 Tournament Semi Finals || Sanya, China || Decision (Unanimous) || 3 || 3:00
|-
|-  style="background:#cfc;"
| 2017-01-01 || Win ||align=left| Wu Xuesong || Kunlun Fight 56 || Sanya, China || Decision || 3 || 3:00 
|-
|-  style="background:#fbb;"
| 2016-12-10 || Loss ||align=left| Buakaw Banchamek || Phoenix Fighting Championship || Lebanon || Decision || 3 || 3:00 
|-
! style=background:white colspan=9 |
|-  style="background:#fbb;"
| 2016-09-17|| Loss ||align=left|  Fabio Pinca || Wicked One Duel || Paris, France || Decision (unanimous) || 5 || 3:00
|-
|-  style="background:#fbb;"
| 2016-08-20 || Loss ||align=left| Tian Xin || Kunlun Fight 50 – 2016 70kg World MAX Tournament Final 16 || Jinan, China || Decision (unanimous) || 3 || 3:00
|-  style="background:#cfc;"
| 2016-07-10|| Win ||align=left| Victor Nagbe || Kunlun Fight 47 – 70 kg Tournament, Final || Nanjing, China || Decision (unanimous) || 3 || 3:00
|-
! style=background:white colspan=9 |
|-  style="background:#cfc;"
| 2016-07-10|| Win ||align=left| Diogo Neves|| Kunlun Fight 47 – 70 kg Tournament, Semi Finals || Nanjing, China || Decision (unanimous) || 3 || 3:00
|-  style="background:#fbb;"
| 2016-01-23 || Loss ||align=left| Qiu Jianliang || WLF World 67 kg 8 Man Tournament, Final || Shanghai, China || KO (Right Hook) || 1 || 1:51
|-
! style=background:white colspan=9 |
|-  style="background:#cfc;"
| 2016-01-23 || Win ||align=left| Xie Lei || WLF World 67 kg 8 Man Tournament, Semi Finals || Shanghai, China || Decision (unanimous) || 3 || 3:00
|-  style="background:#cfc;"
| 2016-01-23 || Win ||align=left| Feng Jie || WLF World 67 kg 8 Man Tournament, Quarter Finals || Shanghai, China || Ext.R Decision (unanimous) || 4 || 3:00
|-  style="background:#fbb;"
| 2015-07-04 || Loss ||align=left| Qiu Jianliang || Wu Lin Feng World Championship 2015 – 67 kg Tournament, Semi Finals || China || Decision || 3 || 3:00
|-  style="background:#fbb;"
| 2015-06-11 || Loss ||align=left| Aikpracha Meenayotin || Final Legend, Final|| Macau, China || Decision || 3 || 3:00
|-
! style=background:white colspan=9 |
|-  style="background:#cfc;"
| 2015-06-11 || Win ||align=left| Gu Hui ||Final Legend, Semi Finals || Macau, China || Decision || 3 || 3:00
|-  style="background:#cfc;"
| 2015-06-06 || Win ||align=left| Tie Yinghua || Wu Lin Feng World Championship 2015 – 67 kg Tournament, Quarter Finals || Jiyuan, China || Decision || 3 || 3:00
|-  style="background:#cfc;"
| 2015-06-06 || Win ||align=left| Ji Xiang || Wu Lin Feng World Championship 2015 – 67 kg Tournament, First Round || Jiyuan, China || Decision || 3 || 3:00
|-  style="background:#cfc;"
| 2015-05-02 || Win ||align=left| Zhao yan || Kunlun Fight 24 || Italy, Verona || Decision || 3 || 3:00
|-  style="background:#fbb;"
| 2014-10-11 || Loss ||align=left| Lee Sung-Hyun || K-1 World MAX 2014 World Championship Tournament Final || Pattaya, Thailand || Extension round decision || 4 || 3:00
|-  style="background:#cfc;"
| 2014-09-13 || Win ||align=left| Seyedisa Alamdarnezam ||  Topking World Series - 70 kg Tournament, Final 16  || Minsk, Belarus ||Decision (unanimous) || 3 || 3:00
|-  style="background:#cfc;"
| 2014-05-22 || Win ||align=left| Artem Pashporin || Grand Prix Russia Open || Nizhny Novgorod, Russia || Decision (unanimous) || 4 || 3:00
|-  style="background:#cfc;"
| 2014-05-22 || Win ||align=left| Deo Phetsangkhat || Grand Prix Russia Open || Nizhny Novgorod, Russia || Decision (unanimous) || 4 || 3:00
|-  style="background:#cfc;"
| 2014-04-14 || Win ||align=left| Yang Zhuo || Combat Banchamek || Surin, Thailand || Decision (unanimous) || 3 || 3:00
|-  style="background:#fbb;"
| 2014-01-25 || Loss ||align=left| Petsanguan Luktupfah || Kunlun Fight 1, Final || Bangkok, Thailand || Decision || || 3:00
|-
! style=background:white colspan=9 |
|-  style="background:#cfc;"
| 2014-01-25 || Win ||align=left| Umar Semata || Kunlun Fight 1, Semi Final || Bangkok, Thailand || || ||
|-  style="background:#fbb;"
| 2013-12-10 || Loss ||align=left| Sagetdao Petpayathai || MAX Muay Thai 5: The Final Chapter, Semi Finals || Khon Kaen, Thailand || Decision || 3 || 3:00
|-  style="background:#fbb;"
| 2013-09-17 || Loss ||align=left| Saenchai PKSaenchaimuaythaigym || Combat Renaissance || Hong Kong ||Decision || 3 || 3:00
|-  style="background:#cfc;"
| 2013-05-06 || Win ||align=left| Petchasawin Seatranferry || MAX Muay Thai 1, Final || Surin, Thailand || KO (High kick) || 2 || 1:15
|-
! style=background:white colspan=9 |
|-  style="background:#cfc;"
| 2013-05-06 || Win ||align=left| Umar Semata || MAX Muay Thai 1, Semi Final || Surin, Thailand || Decision || 3 || 3:00
|-  style="background:#fbb;"
| 2012-12-16 || Loss ||align=left| Singmanee Kaewsamrit || Thai Fight 2012: King of Muay Thai Tournament Finals, 67 kg Tournament Final || Bangkok, Thailand || Decision || 3 || 3:00
|-
! style=background:white colspan=9 |
|-  style="background:#cfc;"
| 2012-11-25 || Win ||align=left| Adaylton Pereira de Freitas || Thai Fight 2012: King of Muay Thai Tournament 2nd Round, 67 kg Tournament Semi Finals || Nakhon Ratchasima, Thailand || Decision || 3 || 3:00
|-  style="background:#cfc;"
| 2012-10-23 || Win ||align=left| Crice Boussoukou || Thai Fight 2012: King of Muay Thai Tournament 1st Round, 67 kg Tournament Quarter Finals || Bangkok, Thailand || Decision || 3 || 3:00
|-  style="background:#fbb;"
| 2012-06-24 || Loss ||align=left| Singmanee Kaewsamrit || Channel 11 "Thailand vs. Russia" || Pattaya, Thailand || Decision || 5 || 3:00
|-  style="background:#cfc;"
| 2012-06-03 || Win ||align=left| Petchasawin Seatranferry  || WKN Kings of Muay Thai  || Belarus || KO (Elbow) || 3 || 
|-  style="background:#fbb;"
| 2012-03-31 || Loss ||align=left| Liam Harrison || The Main Event || Manchester, England || TKO (Low kicks) || 3 || 1:00
|-  style="background:#cfc;"
| 2011-11-26 || Win ||align=left| Ruslan Kushnirenko ||  Big 8 WKN Tournament 2011, Final  || Minsk, Belarus || Decision || 3 || 3:00 
|-
! style=background:white colspan=9 |
|-  style="background:#cfc;"
| 2011-11-26 || Win ||align=left| Ibrahim Konate ||  Big 8 WKN Tournament 2011, Semi Finals || Minsk, Belarus || KO (Low Kick) || 3 ||  
|-  style="background:#cfc;"
| 2011-11-26 || Win ||align=left| Loris Audoui ||  Big 8 WKN Tournament 2011, Quarter Finals || Minsk, Belarus || KO (Knee) || 2 || 
|-  style="background:#fbb;"
| 2011-05-31 || Loss ||align=left| Saiyok Pumpanmuang || Fight Factory Arena 2011 || Hong Kong || TKO (Corner stop/cut by elbow) || 1 || 1:38
|-  style="background:#cfc;"
| 2011-03-12 || Win ||align=left| Angelo Campoli || Fight Code: Dragon Series Round 2 || Milan, Italy || TKO (Doc stop/cut by elbow) || 4 || 1:48
|-  style="background:#fbb;"
| 2011-01-29 || Loss ||align=left| Sak Kaoponlek || Thai Boxe Mania || Turin, Italy || Decision || 5 || 3:00 
|-  style="background:#cfc;"
| 2010-10-24 || Win ||align=left| Imran Khan || Showdown 8 || Sheffield, England, UK || Decision || 5 || 3:00 
|-
! style=background:white colspan=9 |
|-  style="background:#fbb;"
| 2010-09-12 || Loss ||align=left| Sudsakorn Sor Klinmee || W.K.N. World GP Big-8 Tournament '10, Final || Minsk, Belarus || TKO (Doc Stop/ Cut) || 2 ||  
|-
! style=background:white colspan=9 |
|-  style="background:#cfc;"
| 2010-09-12 || Win ||align=left| Erkan Varol || W.K.N. World GP Big-8 Tournament '10, Semi Finals || Minsk, Belarus || Decision || 3 || 3:00 
|-  style="background:#cfc;"
| 2010-09-12 || Win ||align=left| Taylor Harvey || W.K.N. World GP Big-8 Tournament '10, Quarter Finals || Minsk, Belarus || Decision || 3 || 3:00 
|-  style="background:#cfc;"
| 2010-03-23 || Win ||align=left| Santichai Or Boonchauy || W.M.C. I-1 World GP '10, Final || Hong Kong || Decision (Unanimous) || 3 || 3:00 
|-
! style=background:white colspan=9 |
|-  style="background:#cfc;"
| 2010-03-23 || Win ||align=left| Ümit Demirörs || W.M.C. I-1 World GP '10, Semi Finals || Hong Kong || TKO || 1 ||
|-  style="background:#cfc;"
| 2010-03-23 || Win ||align=left| Josh Palmer || W.M.C. I-1 World GP '10, Quarter Finals || Hong Kong || Decision (Unanimous) || 3 || 3:00 
|-  style="background:#fbb;"
| 2010-01-30 || Loss ||align=left| Sudsakorn Sor Klinmee || Campionato Mondiale Thai Boxe || Turin, Italy || KO (Straight Right) || 2 ||  
|-
! style=background:white colspan=9 |
|-  style="background:#cfc;"
| 2009-11-07 || Win ||align=left| Michael Dicks || MSA Muay Thai Premier League || Bolton, England, UK || KO (High Kick) || 1 ||  
|-
! style=background:white colspan=9 |
|-  style="background:#cfc;"
| 2009-09-12 || Win ||align=left| Nopparat Keatkhamtorn || W.K.N. World GP Big-8 Tournament '09, Final || Minsk, Belarus || Decision (Unanimous) || 3 || 3:00  
|-
! style=background:white colspan=9 |
|-  style="background:#cfc;"
| 2009-09-12 || Win ||align=left| Leonardo Monteiro || W.K.N. World GP Big-8 Tournament '09, Semi Finals || Minsk, Belarus || Decision (Unanimous) || 3 || 3:00 
|-  style="background:#cfc;"
| 2009-09-12 || Win ||align=left| Nicolai Tolochko || W.K.N. World GP Big-8 Tournament '09, Quarter Finals || Minsk, Belarus || KO || 2 ||  
|-  style="background:#cfc;"
| 2009-06-26 || Win ||align=left| Mosab Amrani || Champions of Champions II || Montego Bay, Jamaica || Decision (Unanimous) || 5 || 3:00 
|-
! style=background:white colspan=9 |
|-  style="background:#fbb;"
| 2009-04-21 || Loss ||align=left| Santichai Or Boonchauy || W.M.C. I-1 World GP '09, Final || Hong Kong || TKO (leg injury) || 1 || 3:00 
|-
! style=background:white colspan=9 |
|-  style="background:#cfc;"
| 2009-04-21 || Win ||align=left| Mark Sarracino || W.M.C. I-1 World GP '09, Semi Finals || Hong Kong || Decision (Unanimous) || 3 || 3:00 
|-  style="background:#cfc;"
| 2009-04-21 || Win ||align=left| Peyman Shahrokni || W.M.C. I-1 World GP '09, Quarter Finals || Hong Kong || Decision (Unanimous) || 3 || 3:00 
|-  style="background:#cfc;"
| 2008-10-27 || Win ||align=left| Yodchatpol Scorpion Gym || W.M.C. I-1 World Grand Slam '08, Super Fight || Hong Kong || Decision (Unanimous) || 5 || 3:00 
|-  style="background:#cfc;"
| 2008-04-30 || Win ||align=left| Santichai Or Boonchauy || W.M.C. I-1 World GP '08, Final || Hong Kong || Decision (Unanimous) || 3 || 3:00 
|-
! style=background:white colspan=9 |
|-  style="background:#cfc;"
| 2008-04-30 || Win ||align=left| Mehdi Zatout || W.M.C. I-1 World GP '08, Semi Finals || Hong Kong || Decision (Unanimous) || 3 || 3:00 
|-  style="background:#cfc;"
| 2008-04-30 || Win ||align=left| Leonardo Monteiro || W.M.C. I-1 World GP '08, Quarter Finals || Hong Kong || Decision (Unanimous) || 3 || 3:00 
|-  style="background:#cfc;"
| 2007-11-11 || Win ||align=left| Guillaume Mautz || Kings of Muay Thai - Russia || Kostroma, Russia || Decision || 5 || 3:00 
|-  style="background:#cfc;"
| 2007-10-15 || Win ||align=left| Prayoon Sriwiang || WW.M.C. I-1 World Grand Slam '07, Super Fight || Hong Kong || Decision || 5 || 3:00
|-  style="background:#fbb;"
| 2007-06-01 || Loss ||align=left| Neung Songnarong || Belarus vs Thailand || Minsk, Belarus || TKO (Doc Stop/Cut) || 1 ||
|-
! style=background:white colspan=9 |
|-  style="background:#cfc;"
| 2007-05-16 || Win ||align=left| Rudolf Durica || W.M.C. I-1 World GP '07, Final || Hong Kong || TKO (Doc Stop/Cut) || 1 ||  
|-
! style=background:white colspan=9 |
|-  style="background:#cfc;"
| 2007-05-16 || Win ||align=left| Santichai Or Boonchauy || W.M.C. I-1 World GP '07, Semi Finals || Hong Kong || KO (Straight Right) || 2 ||  
|-  style="background:#cfc;"
| 2007-05-16 || Win ||align=left| Chawan Dasri || W.M.C. I-1 World GP '07, Quarter Finals || Hong Kong || TKO (Doc Stop/Cut) || 3 || 2:57
|-  style="background:#cfc;"
| 2006-10-09 || Win ||align=left| Santichai Or Boonchauy || W.M.C. I-1 World GP '06, Final || Hong Kong || Decision || 3 || 3:00  
|-
! style=background:white colspan=9 |
|-  style="background:#cfc;"
| 2006-10-09 || Win ||align=left| Rudolf Durica || W.M.C. I-1 World GP '06, Semi Finals || Hong Kong || Decision (Split) || 3 || 3:00  
|-  style="background:#cfc;"
| 2006-10-09 || Win ||align=left| Benjamin Ritter || W.M.C. I-1 World GP '06, Quarter Finals || Hong Kong || TKO (Ref Stop) || 1 || 
|-  style="background:#fbb;"
| 2005-12-05 || Loss ||align=left| Rudolf Durica || King's Birthday, Lumpinee Stadium || Bangkok, Thailand || Decision || 5 || 3:00  
|-
! style=background:white colspan=9 |
|-  style="background:#cfc;"
| 2005-09-30 || Win ||align=left| Jalal Echaouchi || Kings of Muaythai: Belarus vs Europe || Minsk, Belarus || KO || 2 ||
|-
! style=background:white colspan=9 |
|-  style="background:#cfc;"
| 2004-07-01 || Win ||align=left| Raul Llopis || Kings of Muaythai: Team USA vs. Team Belarus || Minsk, Belarus || Decision || 5 || 3:00  
|-
! style=background:white colspan=9 |
|-  style="background:#cfc;"
| 2002-?-? || Win ||align=left| Bogdan Lukin || Belarus vs Ukraine || Minsk, Belarus ||  ||  || 
|-  style="background:#cfc;"
| 2002-09-14 || Win ||align=left| Adam Johnson || Night of KO || Sopot, Poland || KO || 5 ||  
|-  style="background:#cfc;"
| 2002-?-? || Win ||align=left| Alexei Talantov || || Poland || || ||  
|-
! style=background:white colspan=9 |
|-
| colspan=9 | Legend:

Amateur Muay Thai record 

|-  style="background:#fbb;"
| 2022-02-14 || Loss ||align=left| Oleksandr Yefimenko || I.F.M.A. European Muaythai Championships 2022, First Round -71 kg || Bangkok, Thailand || Decision (Unanimous) || 2 || 2:00 
|- 
|-  style="background:#fbb;"
| 2021-12-11 || Loss||align=left| Jimmy Vienot || I.F.M.A. World Muaythai Championships 2019, Finals -71 kg || Bangkok, Thailand || Decision (Unanimous) || 3 || 2:00 
|- 
! style=background:white colspan=9 | 
|-  style="background:#cfc;"
| 2021-12-10 || Win ||align=left| Onur Seker || I.F.M.A. World Muaythai Championships 2021, Semifinals -71 kg || Bangkok, Thailand || Decision (Unanimous) || 3 || 2:00 
|- 
|-  style="background:#cfc;"
| 2021-12-09 || Win ||align=left| Serhii Otverchenko || I.F.M.A. World Muaythai Championships 2021, Quarterfinals -71 kg || Bangkok, Thailand || Decision (Unanimous) || 3 || 2:00 
|- 
|-  style="background:#cfc;"
| 2021-12-08 || Win ||align=left| Enzo Vaz Martins || I.F.M.A. World Muaythai Championships 2021, Second Round -71 kg || Bangkok, Thailand || Decision (Unanimous) || 1 || 2:00 
|- 
|-  style="background:#cfc;"
| 2021-12-07 || Win ||align=left| Pavlos Bamis || I.F.M.A. World Muaythai Championships 2021, First Round -71 kg || Bangkok, Thailand || Decision (Unanimous) || 3 || 2:00 
|- 
|-  style="background:#cfc;"
| 2019-11-10 || Win ||align=left| Dmitrii Changeliia || I.F.M.A. European Muaythai Championships 2019, Finals -71 kg || Minsk, Belarus || Decision (Unanimous) || 3 || 2:00 
|- 
! style=background:white colspan=9 | 
|-  style="background:#cfc;"
| 2019-11-08 || Win ||align=left| Mindaugas Narauskas || I.F.M.A. European Muaythai Championships 2019, Semifinals -71 kg || Minsk, Belarus || Decision (Unanimous) || 2 || 2:00 
|- 
|-  style="background:#cfc;"
| 2019-11-06 || Win ||align=left| Tahmasib Kerimov || I.F.M.A. European Muaythai Championships 2019, Quarterfinals -71 kg || Minsk, Belarus || Decision (Unanimous) || 1 || 2:00 
|- 
|-  style="background:#fbb;"
| 2018-05-19 || Loss ||align=left| Komsan Tantakhob  || I.F.M.A.  World Muaythai Championships 2018, Finals -71 kg || Cancun, Mexico || Decision (Unanimous) || 3 || 2:00 
|- 
! style=background:white colspan=9 | 
|-  style="background:#cfc;"
| 2018-05-16 || Win ||align=left| Namik Neftaliyev || I.F.M.A.  World Muaythai Championships 2018, Semifinals -71 kg || Cancun, Mexico || Decision (Unanimous) || 3 || 2:00 
|- 
|-  style="background:#cfc;"
| 2018-05-14 || Win ||align=left| Ian Escuza || I.F.M.A.  World Muaythai Championships 2018, Quarterfinals -71 kg || Cancun, Mexico || Decision (Unanimous) || 3 || 2:00 
|- 
|-  style="background:#cfc;"
| 2018-05-12 || Win ||align=left| Marco Antonio Fuentes Garibay || I.F.M.A.  World Muaythai Championships 2018, First Round -71 kg || Cancun, Mexico || Decision (Unanimous) || 3 || 2:00 
|- 
|-  style="background:#fbb;"
| 2016-05-26 || Loss ||align=left| Muensang Suppachai || I.F.M.A.  World Muaythai Championships 2016, Semi Finals -71 kg || Jönköping, Sweden || Decision (Unanimous) || 3 || 2:00 
|- 
! style=background:white colspan=9 | 
|-  style="background:#cfc;"
| 2016-05-23 || Win ||align=left| Teemu Hellevaara || I.F.M.A.  World Muaythai Championships 2016, Quarter Finals -71 kg || Jönköping, Sweden || Decision (Unanimous) || 3 || 2:00 
|-  
|-  style="background:#cfc;"
| 2015-05-19|| Win ||align=left| Seyed Kaveh Soleimani  || I.F.M.A.  World Muaythai Championships 2016, Eighth Finals -71 kg || Jönköping, Sweden || Decision || 3 || 2:00   
|-   
|-  style="background:#fbb;" 
| 2015-08-23 || Loss ||align=left| Muensang Suppachai || I.F.M.A.  Royal World cup Tournament 2015, Finals -71 kg || Bangkok, Thailand || Decision || 3 || 2:00  
|- 
! style=background:white colspan=9 | 
|-  style="background:#cfc;"
| 2015-08-21|| Win ||align=left| Numa Decagwy || I.F.M.A. Royal World cup Tournament 2015, Semi Finals -71 kg || Bangkok, Thailand || Decision || 3 || 2:00  
|-  
|-  style="background:#cfc;"
| 2015-08-17|| Win ||align=left| Akzhanov Rustem || I.F.M.A. Royal World cup Tournament 2015, Quarter Finals -71 kg || Bangkok, Thailand ||  ||  || 
|-  
|-  style="background:#cfc;"
| 2015-08-14|| Win ||align=left| Ali Garada || I.F.M.A. Royal World cup Tournament 2015, Eighth Finals -71 kg || Bangkok, Thailand || Decision || 3 || 2:00  

|-  style="background:#cfc;"
| 2014-09- || Win|| align=left| Marcin Lepkowski || 2014 IFMA European Championships, Final || Krakow, Poland || DEC || 3 || 3:00 
|-
! style=background:white colspan=9 |

|-  style="background:#cfc;"
| 2014-09- || Win|| align=left| Sergey Kulyaba || 2014 IFMA European Championships, Semi Finals || Krakow, Poland || DEC || 3 || 3:00 

|-  style="background:#cfc;"
| 2014-09- || Win|| align=left| Takhmasib Kerimov || 2014 IFMA European Championships, Quarter Finals || Krakow, Poland || DEC || 3 || 3:00 

|-  style="background:#cfc;"
| 2014-09- || Win|| align=left| Zhanserik Amirzhanov || 2014 IFMA European Championships, 1/8 Finals || Krakow, Poland || DEC || 3 || 3:00 

|-  style="background:#cfc;"
| 2014-05-|| Win ||align=left| Ali Batmaz  || I.F.M.A. World Muaythai Championships 2014, Final -67 kg || Langkawi, Malaysia || ||  ||  
|- 
! style=background:white colspan=9 |
|-  style="background:#cfc;"
| 2014-05-|| Win ||align=left| Somwang Sittisak || I.F.M.A. World Muaythai Championships 2014, Semi Finals -67 kg || Langkawi, Malaysia || ||  ||
|-  style="background:#cfc;"
| 2014-05-|| Win ||align=left| Hamza Rahmani  || I.F.M.A. World Muaythai Championships 2014, Quarter Finals -67 kg || Langkawi, Malaysia || ||  ||
|-  style="background:#cfc;"
| 2014-05-|| Win ||align=left| Alessio Arduini  || I.F.M.A. World Muaythai Championships 2014, Eighth Finals -67 kg || Langkawi, Malaysia || ||  ||
|-  style="background:#cfc;"
| 2013-10-23 || Win || align=left| Sergey Kulyaba || SportAccord World Combat Games, final (67 kg)|| Saint-Petersburg, Russia || DEC || 3 || 3:00 
|-
! style=background:white colspan=9 |
|-  style="background:#cfc;"
| 2013-10-21 || Win || align=left| Amirzhanov Zhanserik || SportAccord World Combat Games, semifinal (67 kg)|| Saint-Petersburg, Russia || DEC || 3 || 3:00 
|-  style="background:#cfc;"
| 2013-10-19 || Win || align=left| Barkhouse Jackson || SportAccord World Combat Games, quarterfinal (67 kg)|| Saint-Petersburg, Russia || DEC || 3 || 3:00 

|-  style="background:#fbb;"
| 2013-07-|| Loss ||align=left| Sergey Kulyaba || 2013 IFMA European Championship, Final || Lisbon, Portugal || Decision  || 4 || 2:00
|-
! style=background:white colspan=8 |

|-  style="background:#cfc;"
| 2013-07-25|| Win||align=left| Marcin Łepkowski || 2013 IFMA European Championship, Semi Final || Lisbon, Portugal || Decision  || 4 || 2:00

|-  style="background:#cfc;"
| 2012-09-13 || Win ||align=left| Juri Kehl || 2012 IFMA World Championships 2012, Final || Saint Petersburg, Russia || Decision   || 4 ||2:00 
|- 
! style=background:white colspan=9 |
|-  style="background:#cfc;"
| 2012-09-11 || Win ||align=left| Dee Teerapong || 2012 IFMA World Championships 2012, Semi Finals || Saint Petersburg, Russia || Decision   || 4 ||2:00 

|-  style="background:#cfc;"
| 2012-09-09 || Win ||align=left| Aleksei Ulianov || 2012 IFMA World Championships 2012, Quarter Finals || Saint Petersburg, Russia || Decision  || 4 ||2:00 

|-  bgcolor="#fbb"
| 2011-09- || Loss ||align=left| Jeerasak Inudom || 2011 IFMA World Championships, Final || Tashkent, Uzbekistan || Decision || 4 || 2:00 
|-
! style=background:white colspan=9 |

|-  style="background:#cfc;"
| 2011-09-25|| Win ||align=left| Mavlonbek Kahorov|| 2011 IFMA World Championships, Semi Finals || Tashkent, Uzbekistan || Decision || 4 || 2:00

|-  style="background:#cfc;"
| 2011-09-23|| Win ||align=left| Souein || 2011 IFMA World Championships, Quarter Finals || Tashkent, Uzbekistan || Decision || 4 || 2:00

|-  style="background:#cfc;"
| 2011-04-29 || Win ||align=left| Juri Kehl || I.F.M.A. European Muaythai Championships '11, Final -67 kg || Antalya, Turkey || Decision || 4 || 2:00 
|-
! style=background:white colspan=9 |
|-  style="background:#cfc;"
| 2011-04-28 || Win ||align=left| Sergey Kulyaba || I.F.M.A. European Muaythai Championships '11, Semi Finals -67 kg || Antalya, Turkey || || ||  
|-  style="background:#cfc;"
| 2011-04-27 || Win ||align=left| Aleksei Ulianov || I.F.M.A. European Muaythai Championships '11, Quarter Finals -67 kg || Antalya, Turkey || TKO (Ref Stop) || 3 ||  
|-  style="background:#fbb;"
| 2010-12-02 || Loss ||align=left| Jeeprasak Inudom || I.F.M.A. World Muaythai Championships '10, Quarter Finals -67 kg || Bangkok, Thailand || Decision || 4 || 2:00  
|-  style="background:#cfc;"
| 2010-05-30 || Win ||align=left| Emad Kadyaer || I.F.M.A. European Muaythai Championships 2010, Final -67 kg || Velletri, Italy || Decision || 4 || 2:00 
|-
! style=background:white colspan=9 |
|-  style="background:#cfc;"
| 2010-05-29 || Win ||align=left| Rus Petrov || I.F.M.A. European Muaythai Championships 2010, Semi Final -67 kg || Velletri, Italy || Decision || 4 || 2:00 
|-  style="background:#cfc;"
| 2010-05-28 || Win ||align=left| Fredrik Svensson || I.F.M.A. European Muaythai Championships 2010, Quarter Final -67 kg || Velletri, Italy || TKO (Ref Stop) || 4 || 
|-  style="background:#cfc;"
| 2010-05-27 || Win ||align=left| Martin Pavel Møller || I.F.M.A. European Muaythai Championships 2010, 1st Round -67 kg || Velletri, Italy || || || 
|-|| Decision || 4 || 2:00
|-  style="background:#fbb;"
| 2009-12-05 || Loss ||align=left| Jeeprasak Inudom || I.F.M.A. World Muaythai Championships '09, Final -67 kg || Bangkok, Thailand || || ||
|-
! style=background:white colspan=9 |
|-  style="background:#cfc;"
| 2009-12-? || Win ||align=left| David Teymur || I.F.M.A. World Muaythai Championships '09, Semi Finals -67 kg || Bangkok, Thailand || Decision || 4 || 2:00  
|-  style="background:#fbb;"
| 2008-09-30 || Loss ||align=left| Somkit Tumanil || I.F.M.A. World Muaythai Championships '08, Semi Finals -67 kg || Busan, South Korea || || ||
|-
! style=background:white colspan=9 |
|-  style="background:#cfc;"
| 2007-12-04 || Win ||align=left| Preecha Laoyonkam || I.F.M.A. World Muaythai Championships '07, Final -67 kg || Bangkok, Thailand || Decision || 4 || 2:00  
|-
! style=background:white colspan=9 |
|-  style="background:#cfc;"
| 2007-12-03 || Win ||align=left| Usov Vladyslan || I.F.M.A. World Muaythai Championships '07, Semi Finals -67 kg || Bangkok, Thailand || Decision || 4 || 2:00  
|-  style="background:#cfc;"
| 2007-12-02 || Win ||align=left| Mixahaiahs Adhindagpos || I.F.M.A. World Muaythai Championships '07, Quarter Finals -67 kg || Bangkok, Thailand || TKO || ||  
|-  style="background:#cfc;"
| 2007-12-30 || Win ||align=left| Sebastian Wytwer || I.F.M.A. World Muaythai Championships '07, 1st Round -67 kg || Bangkok, Thailand || Decision || 4 || 2:00  
|-  style="background:#cfc;"
| 2007-09-30 || Win ||align=left| Kurbanali Akaev || W.A.K.O World Championships 2007, K-1 Rules Final -63.5 kg || Belgrade, Serbia || || ||
|-
! style=background:white colspan=9 |
|-  style="background:#cfc;"
| 2007-09-? || Win ||align=left| Sreten Miletic || W.A.K.O World Championships 2007, K-1 Rules Semi Finals -63.5 kg || Belgrade, Serbia || || ||
|-  style="background:#cfc;"
| 2007-09-? || Win ||align=left| Federico Pacini || W.A.K.O World Championships 2007, K-1 Rules Quarter Finals -63.5 kg || Belgrade, Serbia || || ||
|-  style="background:#cfc;"
| 2007-09-? || Win ||align=left| Lukasz Plawecki || W.A.K.O World Championships 2007, K-1 Rules 1st Round -63.5 kg || Belgrade, Serbia || || ||
|-  style="background:#cfc;"
| 2007-03-10 || Win ||align=left| || W.M.F. World Muaythai Championships '07, Final -63.5 kg || Bangkok, Thailand || Decision || 4 || 2:00  
|-
! style=background:white colspan=9 |
|-  style="background:#cfc;"
| 2007-03-08 || Win ||align=left| Syd Barnier || W.M.F. World Muaythai Championships '07, Semi Finals -63.5 kg || Bangkok, Thailand || TKO (Knee) || 1 ||   
|-  style="background:#cfc;"
| 2007-03-? || Win ||align=left| || W.M.F. World Muaythai Championships '07, Quarter Finals -63.5 kg || Bangkok, Thailand || || ||  
|-  style="background:#cfc;"
| 2007-03-04 || Win ||align=left| Michael Tomczykowski || W.M.F. World Muaythai Championships '07, 1st Round -63.5 kg || Bangkok, Thailand || Decision || 4 || 2:00  
|-  style="background:#fbb;"
| 2006-06-06 || Loss ||align=left| Panupan Tanjad || I.F.M.A. World Muaythai Championships '06, Semi Finals -60 kg || Bangkok, Thailand || || ||  
|-
! style=background:white colspan=9 |
|-  style="background:#cfc;"
| 2006-06-05 || Win ||align=left| Valentin Semenov || I.F.M.A. World Muaythai Championships '06, Quarter Finals -60 kg || Bangkok, Thailand || || ||  
|-  style="background:#fbb;"
| 2006-03-26 || Loss ||align=left| Boonnit Charoensit || W.M.F. World Muaythai Championships '06, Final -60 kg || Bangkok, Thailand || Decision || 4 || 2:00  
|-
! style=background:white colspan=9 |
|-  style="background:#cfc;"
| 2006-03-24 || Win ||align=left| Igor Petrov || W.M.F. World Muaythai Championships '06, Semi Finals -60 kg || Bangkok, Thailand || Decision || 4 || 2:00  
|-  style="background:#cfc;"
| 2003-12-03 || Win ||align=left| Jonathan Muyal || I.A.M.T.F. World Muaythai Championships 2003, Final -55.3 kg || Bangkok, Thailand || || ||
|-
! style=background:white colspan=9 |
|-  style="background:#cfc;"
| 2001-11-25 || Win ||align=left| Maxim Slipchenko || W.A.K.O. World Championships 2001, Thai-boxing Final -51 kg || Belgrade, Serbia || || ||
|-
! style=background:white colspan=9 |
|-
| colspan=9 | Legend:

See also 
List of male kickboxers

References

External links

 Gym "Kick Fighter" Official Website

1984 births
Living people
Belarusian male kickboxers
Belarusian Muay Thai practitioners
Flyweight kickboxers
Bantamweight kickboxers
Featherweight kickboxers
Lightweight kickboxers
Welterweight kickboxers
Kunlun Fight kickboxers